Acus is a genus of sea snails, marine gastropod mollusks in the family Terebridae, the auger snails.

The genus name Acus belongs to the Pisces. Therefore Acus Gray, 1847 is no longer accepted, since it is a junior homonym of Acus Lacépède, 1803. Its accepted name is now Oxymeris Dall, 1903.

Description
Whorls simple, aperture elongate, columella simple and thickened, subsutural band present, often ornamented.

Species
 Species brought into synonymy 
 Acus albidus (Gray, 1834): synonym of Oxymeris albida (Gray, 1834) 
 Acus antarcticus E.A. Smith, 1873 : synonym of Euterebra tristis (Deshayes, 1859)
 Acus areolatus (Link, 1807): synonym of Oxymeris areolata (Link, 1807) 
 Acus assimilis Angas, 1867  : synonym of Euterebra tristis (Deshayes, 1859)
 Acus bicolor Angas, 1867  : synonym of Euterebra tristis (Deshayes, 1859)
 Acus caledonicus (G.B. Sowerby III, 1909): synonym of Oxymeris caledonica (G.B. Sowerby III, 1909) 
 Acus chloratus (Lamarck, 1822): synonym of Oxymeris chlorata (Lamarck, 1822) 
 Acus concavus (Say, 1826): synonym of Terebra concava (Say, 1826)
 Acus crenulatus (Linnaeus, 1758): synonym of Oxymeris crenulata (Linnaeus, 1758) 
 Acus dillwynii (Deshayes, 1859): synonym of Oxymeris dillwynii (Deshayes, 1859) 
 Acus dimidiata H. Adams & A. Adams, 1853  : synonym of Acus dimidiatus (Linnaeus, 1758)
 Acus dimidiatus (Linnaeus, 1758): synonym of Oxymeris dimidiata (Linnaeus, 1758) 
 Acus dislocatus (Say, 1822)  : synonym of Terebra dislocata (Say, 1822)
 Acus eburnea (Hinds, 1844)  : synonym of Perirhoe eburnea (Hinds, 1844)
 Acus fatua (Hinds, 1844): synonym of Oxymeris fatua (Hinds, 1844) 
 Acus felinus (Dillwyn, 1817) : synonym of Oxymeris felina (Dillwyn, 1817) 
 Acus lineopunctatus Bozzetti, 2008: synonym of Hastula lineopunctata (Bozzetti, 2008)
 Acus maculatus (Linnaeus, 1758): synonym of Oxymeris maculata (Linnaeus, 1758) 
 Acus rushii Dall, 1889  : synonym of Terebra rushii (Dall, 1889)
 Acus senegalensis (Lamarck, 1822): synonym of Oxymeris senegalensis (Lamarck, 1822) 
 Acus strigatus (G.B. Sowerby I, 1825): synonym of Oxymeris strigata (G.B. Sowerby I, 1825)
 Acus suffusus (Pease, 1889): synonym of Oxymeris suffusa (Pease, 1889)
 Acus thaanumi (Pilsbry, 1921): synonym of Oxymeris costellifera (Pease, 1869)
 Acus trochlea (Deshayes, 1857): synonym of Oxymeris trochlea (Deshayes, 1857)
 Acus troendlei (Bratcher, 1981): synonym of Oxymeris troendlei (Bratcher, 1981)

References

External links 

Terebridae
Gastropod genera
Taxa named by John Edward Gray